The 2009 Formula D season (officially titled Formula Drift Professional Championship) was the sixth season for the Formula D series. The series began April 11 and concluded on October 11. Chris Forsberg took his first series title in a Nissan 350Z; the third season in succession in which a Nissan car had won the championship.

Schedule

Championship standings
Event winners in bold.

Footnotes

References

Formula D seasons
Formula D